Joseph William Stefano (May 5, 1922 – August 25, 2006) was an American screenwriter, known for adapting Robert Bloch's novel as the script for Alfred Hitchcock's film Psycho, and for being the producer and co-writer of the original The Outer Limits television series.

Early years
Stefano was born in Philadelphia, Pennsylvania to a father who was a tailor and a mother who made silk flowers. As a teenager, Stefano was so keen to become an actor that he dropped out of high school two weeks before graduation and traveled to New York City. In Manhattan he adopted the stage name Jerry Stevens.

Stefano's initial career was as a composer of pop music in the 1940s, writing songs for Las Vegas showman Donn Arden. In possession of a large collection of sheet music, he once spent five hours challenging pianist Michael Feinstein on the titles of obscure Tin Pan Alley songs.

Career as screenwriter, producer and director
Stefano began writing movie scripts in the late 1950s, firstly for Martin Ritt with The Black Orchid (1959); his mother's occupation was an influence on the screenplay.

Stefano was commissioned by Alfred Hitchcock to adapt Robert Bloch's novel Psycho (1960) for his film version. His work was recognized by the Mystery Writers of America when he was given a 1961 Edgar Award, for Best Motion Picture Screenplay. Stefano appears briefly onscreen, discussing Bloch's utilization of the basis of the character Norman Bates in the crimes of serial killer Ed Gein, in the documentary Ed Gein: The Ghoul of Plainfield, which can be found on Disc 2 of the DVD release of the remake of The Texas Chainsaw Massacre (2003).

Stefano was offered the task of scripting Hitchcock's The Birds (1963) and Marnie (1964), but was already committed to produce and write for his friend Leslie Stevens' science fiction television anthology series The Outer Limits. Both Stefano and Stevens were involved only during the first season of the show. In the book Writing with Hitchcock, Stefano said that Hitchcock held a grudge over his being unavailable to write the screenplay for Marnie.

After leaving The Outer Limits due to network interference and exhaustion, Stefano wrote, produced and directed The Ghost of Sierra de Cobre (1964; aka The Haunted), a film utilizing many of the crew responsible for The Outer Limits. The thriller Eye of the Cat (1969) and the comedy Futz (1969) were Stefano's last big-screen work for many years. Throughout the 1970s, he wrote many television films such as Revenge! (1971), A Death of Innocence (1971), Home for the Holidays (1972), Live Again, Die Again (1974), Aloha Means Goodbye (1974) and Snowbeast (1977). Stefano also wrote one episode for the first season of Star Trek: The Next Generation (1988) entitled "Skin of Evil". Stefano was one of the Guests of Honor at the 1974 NY Telefantasy Convention (along with Noel Neill, Jim Danforth and William Tuttle), and spent hours signing autographs for hundreds of Outer Limits fans. At the show, he expressed his surprise that so many people still remembered the series almost a decade after its cancellation.

In 1990, he revisited the characters from Psycho with the TV movie script for the prequel, in what he believed had become an increasingly disappointing series of films. Psycho IV: The Beginning (1990) posits the origins of Norman Bates' destructive mother-love, featuring Olivia Hussey as Mrs. Bates. Stefano wrote and executive produced the Al Pacino drama Two Bits (1995), a personal project that fared poorly at the box-office and with critics, leaving Stefano less than enthusiastic about continuing to write for modern Hollywood. Gus Van Sant's remake of Psycho (1998 film) (1998) followed Stefano's script punctiliously, and in the biopic Hitchcock (2012) based on the book Alfred Hitchcock and the Making of Psycho by Stephen Rebello, he is portrayed by Ralph Macchio.

Stefano died of a heart attack at Los Robles Hospital in Thousand Oaks, California, in 2006.

The Outer Limits
Stefano was a producer for the first season of The Outer Limits and wrote a total of 12 episodes. They are:
"Nightmare"
"It Crawled Out of the Woodwork"
"The Zanti Misfits"
"The Mice" (teleplay)
"Don't Open Till Doomsday"
"The Invisibles"
"The Bellero Shield" (story & teleplay)
"Moonstone" (story)
"Fun and Games" (teleplay)
"A Feasibility Study"
"The Chameleon" (story)
"The Forms of Things Unknown"
The last episode was originally a pilot for a proposed TV series called The Unknown, but after ABC rejected it, Stefano reworked it as the season one finale.

Filmography

Films

Television

References

External links
1975 interview
1990 interview

1922 births
2006 deaths
American male screenwriters
American writers of Italian descent
Edgar Award winners
Writers from Philadelphia
Screenwriters from Pennsylvania
20th-century American male writers
20th-century American screenwriters
South Philadelphia High School alumni